Alfred Corbiaux (16 August 1919 – 2005) was a Belgian sprint canoer who competed in the late 1940s. He finished eighth in the K-1 10000 m event at the 1948 Summer Olympics in London.

References
Alfred Corbiaux's profile at Sports Reference.com
Mention of Alfred Corbiaux's death 

1919 births
2005 deaths
Belgian male canoeists
Canoeists at the 1948 Summer Olympics
Olympic canoeists of Belgium
20th-century Belgian people